Phanogomphus militaris, the sulphur-tipped clubtail, is a species of clubtail dragonfly in the family Gomphidae. It is found in central North America.

Phanogomphus militaris was recently considered a member of the genus Gomphus, but in 2017 it became a member of the genus Phanogomphus when Phanogomphus was elevated from subgenus to genus rank.

The IUCN conservation status of Phanogomphus militaris is "LC", least concern, with no immediate threat to the species' survival. The population is stable. The IUCN status was reviewed in 2018.

References

Further reading

 
 
 
 
 

Gomphidae
Insects described in 1858